Cork City Ballet is an Irish ballet company founded in 1992 by Alan Foley, a student of Joan Denise Moriarty. It is one of two professional ballet companies in Ireland. Cork City Ballet performs annually at Cork Opera House, staging (for example) a production of Giselle in 2011. It has toured venues such as Wexford Opera House, The Helix, Tralee's Siamsa Tire and University Concert Hall, Limerick. Cork City Ballet has worked with a number of guest artists and companies such as Royal Swedish Ballet and Kirov Ballet. In 2012, Cork City Ballet commemorated the centenary of the birth of Joan Denise Moriarty, the founder of Irish Theatre Ballet, Ireland's first professional ballet company.

Notable productions
 2006 - La Bayadere (Irish tour)
 2010 - Swan Lake (For centenary of Aloys Fleischmann)
 2011 - Giselle (Prelude to the Joan Denise Moriarty centenary celebrations)
 2011 - Playboy of the Western World (Revival)
 2012 - ''The Sleeping Beauty (For the centenary celebrations of Joan Denise Moriarty)

References

Ballet companies in Ireland
1992 establishments in Ireland
Performing groups established in 1992